Marius Grösch (born 7 March 1994) is a German footballer who plays as a defender for SG Barockstadt.

References

1994 births
Living people
People from Fulda
Sportspeople from Kassel (region)
German footballers
Association football defenders
FC Carl Zeiss Jena players
1. FC Kaiserslautern II players
Regionalliga players
3. Liga players
Oberliga (football) players
Footballers from Hesse